Persoonia fastigiata is a plant in the family Proteaceae and is endemic to the Northern Tablelands of New South Wales.

Description
Flowering mainly occurs from December to January.

Taxonomy and naming
Persoonia fastigiata was first formally described in 1830 by Robert Brown in Supplementum primum Prodromi florae Novae Hollandiae from specimens collected near Port Jackson by Charles Fraser.

Distribution and habitat

References

fastigiata
Flora of New South Wales
Plants described in 1830
Taxa named by Robert Brown (botanist, born 1773)